Matthew 15:27 is a verse in the fifteenth chapter of the Gospel of Matthew in the New Testament.

Content
In the original Greek according to Westcott-Hort for this verse is:
Ἡ δὲ εἶπε, Ναί, Κύριε· καὶ γὰρ τὰ κυνάρια ἐσθίει ἀπὸ τῶν ψιχίων τῶν πιπτόντων ἀπὸ τῆς τραπέζης τῶν κυρίων αὐτῶν.  

In the King James Version of the Bible the text reads:
And she said, Truth, Lord: yet the dogs eat of the crumbs which fall from their masters’ table.

The New International Version translates the passage as:
"Yes, Lord," she said, "but even the dogs eat the crumbs that fall from their masters' table."

Analysis
The woman humbly perseveres in her aim, "Yes Lord." Agreeing that she is a worthless dog; and that to such a one the bread of children is not to be cast, still even in this low estate, she claims the need to be attended to.

She did not ask for an abundance of bread. The miraculous cure she looked for was only "a crumb," in contrast to the many splendid miracles done among the Jews, which Jesus calls children, but she reverently calls her masters. MacEvilly says that it is as if she said, "nourish me, therefore, as whelps are nourished, with a crumb of the bread that falls from my masters' table."

Commentary from the Church Fathers
Chrysostom: "Observe this woman’s prudence; she does not dare to contradict Him, nor is she vexed with the commendation of the Jews, and the evil word applied to herself; But she said, Yea, Lord, yet the dogs eat of the crumbs which fall from their masters’ table. He said, It is not good; she answers, ‘Yet even so, Lord;’ He calls the Jews children, she calls them masters; He called her a dog, she accepts the office of a dog; as if she had said, I cannot leave the table of my Lord."

Jerome: "Wonderful are shown the faith, patience, and humility of this woman; faith, that she believed that her daughter could be healed; patience, that so many times overlooked, she yet perseveres in her prayers; humility, that she compares herself not to the dogs, but to the whelps. I know, she says, that I do not deserve the children’s bread, and that I cannot have whole meat, nor sit at the table with the master of the house, but I am content with that which is left for the whelps, that through humble fragments I may come to the amplitude of the perfect bread."

Chrysostom: "This was the cause why Christ was so backward, that He knew what she would say, and would not have her so great excellence hid; whence it follows, Then Jesus answered and said unto her, O woman, great is thy faith, be it unto thee according to thy will. Observe how the woman herself had contributed not a little to her daughter’s healing and therefore Christ said not unto her, ‘Let thy daughter be healed,’ but, Be it unto thee according to thy will; that you may perceive that she had spoken in sincerity, and that her words were not words of flattery, but of abundant faith. And this word of Christ is like that word which said, Let there be a firmament (Gen. 1:6.) and it was made; so here, And her daughter was made whole from that hour. Observe how she obtains what the Apostles could not obtain for her; so great a thing is the earnestness of prayer. He would rather that we should pray for our own offences ourselves, than that others should pray for us."

Saint Remigius: "In these words is given us a pattern of catechizing and baptizing children; for the woman says not ‘Heal my daughter,’ or ‘Help her,’ but, Have mercy upon me, and help me. Thus there has come down in the Church the practice that the faithful are sponsors to God for their young children, before they have attained such age and reason that they can themselves make any pledge to God. So that as by this woman's faith her daughter was healed, so by the faith of Catholics of mature age their sins might be forgiven to infants. Allegorically; This woman figures the Holy Church gathered out of the Gentiles. The Lord leaves the Scribes and Pharisees, and comes into the parts of Tyre and Sidon, this figures His leaving the Jews and going over to the Gentiles. This woman came out of her own country, because the Holy Church departed from former errors and sins."

Jerome: "And the daughter of this Chananæan I suppose to be the souls of believers, who were sorely vexed by a dæmon, not knowing their Creator, and bowing down to stones."

Saint Remigius: "Those of whom the Lord speaks as children are the Patriarchs and Prophets of that time. By the table is signified the Holy Scripture, by the fragments the best precepts, or inward mysteries on which Holy Church feeds; by the crumbs the carnal precepts which the Jews keep. The fragments are said to be eaten under the table, because the Church submits itself humbly to fulfilling the Divine commands."

Rabanus Maurus: "But the whelps eat not the crust only, but the crumbs of the children’s bread, because the despised among the Gentiles on turning to the faith, seek out in Scripture not the outside of the letter, but the spiritual sense, by which they may be able to profit in good acts."

Jerome: "Wonderful change of things! Once Israel the son, and we the dogs; the change in faith has led to a change in the order of our names. Concerning them is that said, Many dogs hare come about me; while to us is said, as to this woman, Thy faith hath made thee whole. (Ps. 22:16.)"

References

External links
Other translations of Matthew 15:27 at BibleHub

15:27